Claire Suzanne Elizabeth Cooney (born 12 December 1981) is an American writer of fantasy literature. She is best known for her fantasy poetry and short stories and has won the Rhysling Award for her poem "The Sea King's Second Bride" in 2011 and the World Fantasy Award—Collection for her collection Bone Swans in 2016.

Biography 
Cooney grew up in Phoenix, Arizona, before leaving after 20 years, lived in Chicago for 10 years, lived in Rhode Island for five years, and then moved to Queens, New York, to live with her husband: author, professor, and game designer, Carlos Hernandez. During her time in Chicago, she attended Columbia College, where she received her degree in fiction writing with a minor in theater.

In addition to writing, she is a poet, a musician, an actor, and audiobook narrator.

Awards and honors 
In 2022, Kirkus Reviews named Saint Death's Daughter one of the best science fiction and fantasy books of the year.

Works

Novels 

 Saint Death's Daughter (April 2022) 
 The Twice-Drowned Saint (June 2020; in A Sinister Quartet, ed. Mike Allen)

Novellas 
 The Big Bah-Ha (April 2010) 
Desdemona and the Deep (July 2019)

Collections 
 Jack o' the Hills (February 2011) 
How to Flirt in Faerieland & Other Wild Rhymes (May 2012) 
 Bone Swans (July 2015) 
The Witch in the Almond Tree and Other Stories (October 2020)
Dark Breakers (February 2022)

Series

Dark Breakers 
 The Breaker Queen (Oct 2014)
 The Two Paupers (Jan 2015)
Desdemona and the Deep (July 2019)

 "Salissay's Laundries" (February 2022)
 "Longergreen" (February 2022)
 "Susurra to the Moon" (February 2022)

The Witch's Garden 
 The Witch in the Almond Tree (July 2014)
 Witch, Beast, Saint: an Erotic Fairy Tale (July 2014)

Short fiction 
 "Lorelei's Little Deaths" from Book of Dead Things (2007)
 "Stone Shoes" from Subterranean Online, Summer (2007)
 "My Body Your Banquet" from Hell in the Heartland (2007)
 "Three Fancies from the Infernal Garden" from Subterranean Online, Winter (2009)
 "Braiding the Ghosts" from Clockwork Phoenix 3: New Tales of Beauty and Strangeness (2010)
 "Household Spirits" from Strange Horizons (2010)
 "Pale, and from a Sea-Wave Rising" from Apex Magazine (2010)
 "The Last Sophia" from Strange Horizons (2011)
 "The Canary of Candletown" from Steam-Powered II: More Lesbian Steampunk Stories (2011)
 "Zing Zou Zou" from Toasted Cake, #24 (2012)
"Godmother Lizard" from Black Gate Magazine (2012)
 "Life on the Sun" from Black Gate Magazine (2012); reprinted in Bone Swans
 "Martyr's Gem" from Giganotosaurus (2013)
 "Ten Cigars" from Strange Horizons (2013)
 "How the Milkmaid Struck a Bargain With the Crooked One" from Giganotosaurus (2013) 
 "The Bone Swans of Amandale" from Bone Swans (2015); reprinted in The Year's Best Science Fiction & Fantasy Novellas (2016)
 "The Book of May" (with Carlos Hernandez) from Clockwork Phoenix 5 (2016)
 "Though She Be But Little" from Uncanny Magazine (2017)
 "Lily-White & The Thief of Lesser Night" from Mad Hatters and March Hares (Dec 2017)
"As for Peace, Call it Murder" from Sword and Sonnet (September 2018)
"Or Perhaps Up" from Where the Veil is Thin (2020)
"A Minnow, or Perhaps a Colossal Squid" with Carlos Hernandez, from Mermaids Monthly (April 2021)
"From the Archives of the Museum of Eerie Skins: An Account" from Uncanny Magazine (July 2021)
"Snowed In" with Carlos Hernandez, from The Bridge to Elsewhere, ed. Julia Rios and Alana Joli Abbott (2022)

Poems 
 Sunday Ramble (2008)
 Cody Coyote (2009)
 Coyote Does Chicago (2009)
 Goblin Girls (2009)
 Ere One Can Say It Lightens (2010)
 She Who Rules the Bitter Reaches (2010)
 The Sea King's Second Bride (2010)
 Dogstar Men (2010)
 Postcards from Mars (2011)
 Sleeping Furies (2012)
 What Is Owed (2013)
 Voyage to a Distant Star (2013)
 Threnody (2013)
 Little Sally and the Bull Fiddle God (2014)
 Deep Bitch (2015)
 The Saga of Captain Jens (2015)
 Toujours Il Coûte Trop Cher (with Mike Allen) (2015)
 Ivan Icarus (2016)
 Foxgirl Cycle Song: 1 (2016)
"The Wyrm of Lirr" (The Book of Dragons, ed. Jonathan Strahan, July 2020) 
"The Sole-Stitcher"(The Deadlands, November 2021)
"Werewoman" (Strange Horizons, December 2021)
"Nightworld," "Visiting Child," "The Ogress" (Ghoul II, March 2021)

Musical albums 
 Alecto! Alecto! (as Brimstone Rhine) (July 2015)
 Headless Bride (as Brimstone Rhine) (Jan 2016)
Corbeau Blanc, Corbeau Noir (2018)

References

External links 

 
 Interview with C. S. E. Cooney by Uncanny Magazine
 C. S. E. Cooney from Metaphor to Manticore by Black Gate
 The Music of Brimstone Rhine

1981 births
Living people
World Fantasy Award-winning writers
Writers from Phoenix, Arizona
Columbia College Chicago alumni
American women short story writers
21st-century American women